Cornel Campbell aka Don Cornel or Don Gorgon (born 23 November 1945 in Kingston, Jamaica) is a reggae singer, best known for his trademark falsetto voice, and his recordings at Studio One in the late 1960s and his later work with Bunny Lee in the 1970s.

Biography
Campbell has one of Jamaican music's distinctive falsettos. His first name was mistakenly spelled with two L's on a record and has been commonly misquoted since. He prefers the correct spelling: Cornel Campbell. Campbell's singing career began in his local church choir. 

At age eleven, in 1956, he was introduced to trombonist Rico Rodriguez, who took him to Clement Dodd's studio, where he recorded his first single, "My Treasure". Further singles followed, including "Turndown Date", as Jamaican music transformed from rhythm and blues to ska, with backing from The Skatalites.  

He later recorded for King Edwards backed by The Bell Stars, before moving on to Duke Reid's Treasure Isle, where he formed The Sensations along with Jimmy Riley, Buster Riley, and Aaron Davis. When The Sensations split, Campbell emerged as leader of his own new vocal group, The Eternals, with Ken Price and Errol Wisdom, recording perennial favourites such as "Queen of the Minstrel" and "Stars". He was also briefly a member of The Uniques in the 1960s, although he may not have contributed to any recordings by the group at that time.

Solo career
In 1971, performing now as a solo artist, Campbell began a long association with Bunny Lee, initially working in the lovers rock genre, but soon working more roots songs into his repertoire.  His self-titled debut album appeared in 1973, but his popularity peaked in the mid 1970s with the 'flying hi-hat' sound (played by drummer Santa Davis), leading to major Jamaican hits "Natty Dread in a Greenwich Farm", "Dance in a Greenwich Farm", and "The Gorgon". 

He later enjoyed a huge hit in the early 1980s rub-a-dub era with "Boxing" for Joe Gibbs. Throughout the 1970s, he also recorded with other record producers such as Winston Holness ("I Heart Is Clean") and Winston Riley ("Them A Bad"). By the late 1970s, Campbell's popularity had begun to wane and he increasingly concentrated on love songs, and after the mid 1980s, new recordings were less common, although he has maintained a strong following.

The Uniques were revived in the late 1970s, with Campbell joining Jimmy Riley and Lloyd Charmers in the group. This line-up recorded the Showcase vol. 1 album, and Campbell and Riley recorded the Give Thanks album in 1979. The group was again revived in 1997, with a line-up of Riley, Cornell Campbell, and Al Campbell, the group recording a self-titled album.

In 2001, "King in My Empire", featuring Cornell Campbell, was released by Rhythm & Sound. The song was produced by Moritz Von Oswald and Mark Ernestus.

Albums

Solo
Cornell Campbell (1973) Trojan
Natty Dread in a Greenwich Farm (1975) Total Sounds
Dance in a Greenwich Farm (1975) Grounation
The Gorgon (1976) Total Sounds/Angen
Stalowatt (1976) Third World
Turn Back The Hands of Time (1977) Third World
Showcase (1978), Big Phil
Superstar (1979) Micron (reissued as Sweet Baby (1979) Burning Sounds/Abraham)
Yes I Will (1979) Micron
The Inspector General (1980) Imperial
Ropin''' (1980) JusticeBoxing (1982) StarlightBoxing Round (1982) Joe GibbsWhat's Happening To Me (1982) Joe GibbsFollow Instructions (1983) Mobiliser (reissued as Press Along Natty (1993) Tappa)Money (1983) Live & LearnFight Against Corruption (1983) Vista (reissued as Tell The People (1997) Prestige)Big Things (2000) Don OneRock My Soul (2008) Sip a CupNew Scroll (2013), Zion HighNothing Can Stop Us (2013), Strut – Cornell Campbell meets The SoothsayersSweet Baby (2021) Burning Sounds
Split albumsJohnnie Clarke Meets Cornell Campbell (1983) Vista (split with Johnnie Clarke)Cornell Campbell Meets The Gaylads (1984) Culture Press (split with The Gaylads)Double Top (1991) Tamoki Wambesi (split with Junior Reid)Barry Brown Meets Cornell Campbell (2001) Culture Press (with Barry Brown)

CompilationsReggae Sun (1980)Silver Jubilee (1993) RhinoSweet Dancehall Collection (1995) JA ClassicsCollection: 20 Magnificent Hits, Striker LeeMagic Spell (1999) Studio OneSings Hits From Studio One And More (1999) RhinoThe Minstrel (2000) WestsideI Shall Not Remove (2000) Blood & FireMy Confession (2002) CharlyOriginal Blue Recordings (2003) Moll SelektaNatty Dread (2005) TrojanMy Destination (2005) Kingston SoundsVery Best (2006) Super PowerLegend (2011), JusticeTwenty Love Songs (2011), Culture Town70 Greatest Hits (2013), Alexander Music Group12" Collection (2014), Alexander Music GroupI Man A The Stal-A-Watt (2019), 17 North Parade 

With The UniquesShowcase Vol. 1 (1978) Third World/JackpotGive Thanks (1979) PlantThe Uniques'' (1999) Charm

See also
List of reggae musicians

References

External links
Cornell Campbell on Myspace
Album discography at Roots Archives
Album discography at Reggae Discographies
Rebel Base interview
Cornell Campbell interview with Sarah C of Vibes 93.8 FM, May 2008 (audio)

Video
PUNKCAST#23 Cornell Campbell & The Slackers @ The Cooler NYC –  15 September 2000. (RealPlayer)

1945 births
Living people
Musicians from Kingston, Jamaica
Jamaican reggae musicians
Island Records artists
Trojan Records artists
The Sensations (Jamaican group) members
The Uniques (Jamaican group) members